Ghadar di Gunj (Punjabi: ਗ਼ਦਰ ਦੀ ਗੂੰਜ, غدر دی گنج, translation: Echoes of Mutiny) is a compilation of nationalist and socialist literature that was produced in the early stages of the Ghadar movement.

Published by the Hindustan Ghadar press in the Ghadar weekly from San Francisco in 1913-14, the literature consists of a collection of songs and poems in Gurumukhi and Shahmukhi and covered addressed the political situation in India. Pamphlets titles Ghadar di Goonj and Talwar were also produced at this time for circulation in India. These were deemed seditionist publications by the British Indian government and banned from publication and circulation in India.

Notes

References
Ghadar di Gunj
Sikh Religion, Culture and Ethnicity by Gurharpal Singh, Christopher Shackle. 2001
Handbook of Twentieth-Century Literatures of India by Nalini Natarajan, Emmanuel Sampath Nelson.1996

External links 
The Hindustan Ghadar Collection. Bancroft Library, University of California, Berkeley

Ghadar Party
Pamphlets
Indian independence movement
Literature of Indian independence movement
1913 books
Punjabi literature